Thomas Wise or Tom Wise may refer to:
Sir Thomas Wise (died 1630) (died 1629), English politician, MP for Bere Alston, 1621
Thomas James Wise (1859–1937), manuscript forger
Thomas Wise (died 1641) (c. 1605–1641), English politician
Thomas Wise (priest) (1671–1726), clergyman of the Church of England
Thomas A. Wise (1865–1928), American actor and president of The Lambs
Thomas Dewey Wise (born 1939), American politician in the state of South Carolina
Thomas Alexander Wise, Scottish physician, medical author, polymath and collector
Tom Wise (politician) (born 1948), Independent and UKIP member of the European Parliament

See also
Thomas Wyse (1791–1862), Irish politician